Axiniphyllum is a genus of flowering plants in the family Asteraceae.

 Species
All the species are endemic to Mexico.
 Axiniphyllum corymbosum Benth.	 - Oaxaca
 Axiniphyllum durangense B.L.Turner - Durango
 Axiniphyllum pinnatisectum (Paul G.Wilson) B.L.Turner	- Guerrero
 Axiniphyllum sagittalobum B.L.Turner - Guerrero
 Axiniphyllum scabrum (Zucc.) S.F.Blake	 - Oaxaca
 Axiniphyllum tomentosum Benth.

References

Millerieae
Asteraceae genera
Endemic flora of Mexico